The Romelia Wildlife Refuge is a  Wildlife refuge in Costa Rica, part of the Tempisque Conservation Area, near Montezuma, Costa Rica on the Nicoya Peninsula.

References

External links
Romelia Wildlife Refuge at Costa Rica National Parks

Nature reserves in Costa Rica
Geography of Puntarenas Province